"Neighbors" is a song by American rapper J. Cole, released on December 9, 2016, recorded  for his fourth studio album, 4 Your Eyez Only. It was released on April 25, 2017, as the second single off the album.

Background
The song was recorded at the Sheltuh in North Carolina and Electric Lady Studios, and was produced and written by J. Cole himself. During an interview with Complex on December 9, 2016, Dreamville in-house producer, Elite explained the incident which occurred a few months prior that inspired the story in the track, "Neighbors", saying,

The song's instrumental was derived from a slowed-down, reversed sample of Cole's 2013 single, "Forbidden Fruit" which features Kendrick Lamar.  "Forbidden Fruit" contains a sample of the song "Mystic Brew" by American Jazz musician Ronnie Foster. Cole revealed this during shows on his 4 Your Eyez Only World Tour, performing "Forbidden Fruit", then having the instrumental played in reverse as he transitioned into a performance of "Neighbors".

Chart performance
Upon its first week of release, "Neighbors" debuted at number 13 on the US Billboard Hot 100 and at number 8 on the US Hot R&B/Hip-Hop Songs chart.

Music video
The music video of the song was released on May 1, 2017. Cole used the footage of the incident from the closed-circuit television of his house as the video. The video only plays the first verse of the song.

Charts

Weekly charts

Year-end charts

Certifications

References

2016 songs
J. Cole songs
Songs written by J. Cole
2017 singles